Whidbey Telecom (legally Whidbey Telephone Company and often called Whidbey Tel) is a private, independent telecommunications company operating on the South End of Whidbey Island in Washington State, the community of Point Roberts, Washington, and its affiliate Hat Island Telephone Company on Hat (Gedney) Island.  Whidbey Telecom has been locally owned and operated since it started business in 1908.

History
Whidbey Telephone was founded in 1908 by local business owners and farmers in Langley, Washington. They wanted to provide locally-owned telephone service to the Whidbey Island community. By 1902, all residents of South Whidbey had access to the Whidbey Telephone system. The end of World War II saw an influx of new residents to Whidbey Island, putting a significant burden on the small phone company. 

By 1950, the company began to make major upgrades to its network but prior to this was losing money. In 1953 local businessman David C. Henny purchased a controlling interest in Whidbey Telephone Company. Under his leadership, the company restructured and become profitable again. All while concurrently completing much-needed upgrades to the infrastructure. The Henny family still controls the company, today.

Until 1961, Whidbey Telephone had overhead wires, and when the storms came, the lines went down due to wind, trees, and snow. After several winters, where more than 60% of their customers lost service, the company decided to bury its entire network. By 1961, 100% of its lines were buried, a first for local telephone companies. Since then there has not been widespread service disruption due to damaged to company-owned infrastructure.

Whidbey Telephone became the first local phone company (west of the Rocky Mountains) to provide Internet access to its customers in 1994. 

In 2000, Whidbey began providing DSL service to its customers. In just two years, the entire service area, including Point Roberts and Hat Island had DSL service available. For a few years, the company's Internet division, Whidbey.NET, even offered DSL to residents in Verizon territory on Whidbey Island and other local communities. Whidbey Telecom's current internet and phone service area includes all of South Whidbey Island, including Clinton, Langley, Freeland, and most of Greenbank, Washington, as well as Hat (Gendney) Island, and Pt. Roberts.

In 2016 Whidbey Telecom announced it would be installing fiber optic cables to homes and businesses in its service area.  The BiG GiG® Fiber Network launched later that year in Langley, making Whidbey Telecom the only internet provider on Whidbey Island to provide synchronous upload and download speeds of up to 1000 Mbit/s for both residential and business subscribers.  Services were expanded to cover downtown Clinton, downtown Freeland, Bayview Center, Ken's Korner, and a few dense neighborhoods by the end of 2017.  

In 2019, Whidbey Telecom introduced The BiG GiG Fiber Network in Point Roberts, Washington.

Internet services
Internet services on Whidbey Island began in 1994. Whidbey Telephone began Whidbey Internet Services (WIS) to cover the telephone company's service area. At the same time, another company, Whidbey Connections, Inc. (WCI), was founded to serve customers of GTE on the north end of the island. WIS soon expanded to cover people on the north end of the Island, and WCI later expanded to also serve people on the south end of Whidbey Island. WCI's Internet domain was 'whidbey.net', whereas WIS's was 'whidbey.com'.  Initial available Internet speeds were 14.4kbit/s and later 28.8kbit/s, as demand grew.

In 1995, Whidbey Telephone Company acquired the assets of Whidbey Connections, Inc., and integrated into Whidbey Internet Service to form WhidbeyNET. As a result of the merger, some customers of Whidbey.NET on the south end of Whidbey continue to have '.net' addresses whereas most south end customers have '.com'.
Until 2001, WhidbeyNET maintained two different customer databases on their servers, leading some customers to have different passwords, and even different usernames depending on how and where they connected to the ISP.

Whidbey.NET began to offer DSL services to some customers (within one mile of local exchange systems) in 2000. By 2002, all Whidbey Telephone customers were capable of receiving Whidbey.NET DSL on south Whidbey Island and in Point Roberts. In 2005, the newly rebranded Whidbey Telecom Internet and Broadband began offering 5.5 Mbit/s DSL, and set their other speeds at 512kbit/s, and 2.5 Mbit/s. However, Whidbey Telecom does not offer DSL services in Verizon territory on Whidbey Island, but did provide dial-up services in those areas until 2019.  Dial-up services are no longer offered by Whidbey Telecom.

In the spring of 2009, Whidbey Telecom began upgrading customers, free of charge, from ADSL to ADSL2+ services. This included speed upgrades to 18Mbit/s, 12Mbit/s, and 6Mbit/s.  A new 30Mbit/s bonded ADSL2+ service was also made available at that time. Additionally, existing dial-up customers were offered a discounted 3Mbit/s service, in advance of Whidbey Telecom's phasing out their dial-up service on South Whidbey and in Point Roberts which was completed by Summer 2010.  With the addition of Television services, even faster Internet connections have become available, utilizing VDSL2+ technologies up to 50Mbit/s.

In 2016, Whidbey Telecom announced a campaign to install Fiber to the Home. Known as "The Big Gig", the service offers 1Gbit/s synchronous service to homes and businesses.  The first customers were connected by October of that same year. The initial build out is focusing on the communities of Langley, Freeland, Clinton, and Bayview.  The plan is to provide fiber services to 100% of customers, both on South Whidbey, but also Pt. Roberts. As of 2021, fiber service has expanded to include Harbor Hills Neighborhood, Scatchet Head, Sandy Hook, Classic/Old County Rd., Cedar Cove, and Ken's Korner.

Free WiFi Hotspots are also available throughout the community, at public and private buildings, community parks, the Fairgrounds, and the Ferry Holding Lines.  All are free to use for anyone needing access.  Whidbey Telecom also provided the first "Ferry Cams" for commuters, which prompted WSDOT to do the same at most of their other facilities, so that ferry users were fully aware of the wait times and traffic conditions.

Television
It was announced in 2011, that Whidbey Telecom would offer television to customers at competitive rates to those offered by Comcast.  The service utilized Microsoft Mediaroom IPTV technology to deliver television over the DSL service.  The new WhidbeyTV service was launched in the summer of 2013 quickly became a significant player in the community, with competitive pricing, local support services, and its own channel, called "WhidbeyTV", producing original shows and sharing local content.  The service is cost competitive with the other terrestrial options, and continued to expand offerings and service areas until 2018. 

In late 2018, Whidbey Telecom announced it was shifting its TV strategy from providing linear TV to partnering with Dish.  This shift was due to the dramatic rise in content costs and a fundamental change in the viewing habits of society from linear to streaming entertainment.  While it was a difficult decision by the company it enabled Whidbey Telecom to focus on strengthening its investment in its local fiber optic network to its customers.  The company continues to provide its local WhidbeyTV video, streaming for free through WhidbeyTV.com.

Security and Alarms
In the early 2000s, Whidbey Telecom began its own alarm installation and monitoring company, branded as "American Alarms". Due to the unique natures of the Island, the rebranded "Whidbey Telecom Security & Alarms" uses all communications methods available in order to ensure proper operation on Whidbey Island, Pt. Roberts, and into Skagit County; including POTS, WiFi, IP, and Cellular communications.  Modern installations are partnered with Alarm.com software to provide a level of security to customers that one would not expect in such a rural area.
 	
Whidbey Telecom has a UL Listed Alarm Monitoring Center, that is open 24/7 and located at their headquarters in Langley {Bayview}.

Rebranding
In September 2004, Whidbey Telephone company decided to consolidate its operations under a single name, Whidbey Telecom. This new identity was previewed at the Island County Fair and was officially launched in September. 

'Whidbey.NET' became 'Whidbey Telecom Internet and Broadband'
'Western Long Distance' became 'Whidbey Telecom Long Distance'
'American Alarm Systems, Inc.' became 'Whidbey Telecom Security and Alarms'

Service area and Exchanges
All operate in Area Code 360

Whidbey Island
Any new customers or lines are assigned numbers based on geographic location, but customers are no longer required to change prefix when moving between service areas.
Clinton  341
Freeland  331
Langley - 221
Bayview  321
Locales outside of the service area with a South Whidbey number (Foreign Exchange)  321
Maxwellton Beach, Scatchet Head, and Sandy Hook/Cultus Bay  579
Bells Beach, Baby Island, Beverly Beach  730
Greenbank  222

Point Roberts
All Areas  945

Hat (Gedney) Island
Hat Island Telephone Company

All Areas  444

References

Telecommunications companies of the United States